Gillette is a station on the Gladstone Branch of the Morris & Essex Lines of NJ Transit in Long Hill Township, New Jersey. It is located at the intersection of Mountain Avenue and Jersey Avenue in the Gillette portion of Long Hill Township.

History 
George Howell was an engineer who surveyed the area for the New Jersey West Line Railroad. The station is named after the local unincorporated area. According to local story, the area of Gillette was named after Rachel Gillette Cornish. Mr. Howell was married to Rachel Melissa Cornish, the daughter of Rachel Gillette. Since the Gladstone Branch was opened, the station has never consisted more than a shelter for passengers on the side of the tracks, unlike nearby Stirling, which once boasted a large station depot built in 1872.

Station layout
Gillette station contains one track and one low-level side platform on the inbound side of the track. The platform has a covered bench shelter, several newsstands, a pay telephone, and numerous benches. This station has a ticket vending machine. Bike racks are present next to the shelter. The station has an 82-space lot owned by New Jersey Transit, but contracted out to the township. Of the 82 spaces, 2 are handicap-accessible, although the station is not handicapped-accessible.

See also 
Millington station - The third station in Long Hill Township.

References

External links

 Station from Mountain Avenue from Google Maps Street View

Long Hill Township, New Jersey
NJ Transit Rail Operations stations
Former Delaware, Lackawanna and Western Railroad stations
Railway stations in the United States opened in 1872
1872 establishments in New Jersey
Railway stations in Morris County, New Jersey